Faithful Ruslan, subtitled The Story of a Guard Dog, is a 1975 novel by Soviet dissident writer Georgi Vladimov. It is the story of a guard dog from a Gulag labor camp, told from the point of view of the dog itself.

According to the author, the purpose of the novel was "to see the hell through the eyes of a dog who assumes it is a paradise".

"Ruslan" is a Russian given name, acquired the gist of high style after the poem Ruslan and Ludmila by Alexander Pushkin.

Plot summary
The story begins from the moment the labor camp is closed and demolished, and includes the dog's best reminiscences of its past.

After the labor camp is dismantled, Ruslan's handler chases the dog away, unable to shoot him.  Many other guard dogs of the camp had the same luck. Over time most of them somehow found their ways in "civil" life, but Ruslan cannot forget his duty; he perceives the empty camp as one huge prisoners' escape and prefers to starve than to take food from stranger's hands. After some time Ruslan accidentally meets his master chatting with a former Gulag inmate nicknamed Potyorty (Потёртый, "Shabby"), but the master chases him away again, and Ruslan unexpectedly associates himself with Potyorty. The latter thinks he tamed the formerly vicious dog, but Ruslan sees Potyorty as a runaway inmate who returned voluntarily (he saw this happen many times) and decides to guard him until the "normal order of things" is restored.

Initially all dogs used to come to the railway station, waiting in vain for a train with a fresh party of inmates. Eventually all but Ruslan cease doing so. At last a train arrives, bringing a party of enthusiastic workers for a "great construction site of communism" to be launched at the site of the camp. Workers form a column and march forward with songs. Thinking that these are prisoners, the former guard dogs come out and take their usual posts around the column. The newcomers are puzzled, but the locals know what's going on and watch with morose expectation. A couple of workers step out of line and, perceiving this as an escape attempt, the dogs attack them. This causes the rest of the workers to panic, which causes more dogs to attack and soon the town is in chaos. The townspeople and workers fight the dogs and eventually kill all of them. Ruslan is mortally wounded, but manages to crawl back to the railway station, where he remembers his littermates being killed shortly after their birth and wonders if they were luckier than he, before finally dying himself.

Literary opinions
As Andrey Gavrilov of Radio Liberty put it, it is a "portrayal of an inhuman system, which destroys in an animal something we would have liked to humanize."

Andrey Sinyavsky says that Ruslan is the picture of an ideal communist hero: his honesty, loyalty, heroism, discipline make him a true bearer of the Moral Code of the Builder of Communism. And at the same time it is a picture of how these ideal qualities become perverted in the communist society.

Adaptations
In 1991 a film (:ru:Верный Руслан (История караульной собаки))  was shot based on the novel.

In 2017 a play based on the novel, written by Helena Kaut-Howson based on Glenny's translation, was performed jointly by the Citizens Theatre in Glasgow, the Belgrade Theatre, Coventry, and KT Productions.

Editions
Faithful Ruslan. The Story of a Guard Dog, translated by Michael Glenny 
Simon & Schuster, 1979.
Melville House Publishing, 2011,

References

Further reading
Пронин А. А., Права человека: аспекты проблемы, pp. 143-151

Novels set in the Gulag
1975 Russian novels
Novels about dogs